Parthenius (died 1770) was Greek Orthodox Patriarch of Jerusalem (1737 – October 28, 1766). He was born in Athens.

1770 deaths
18th-century Greek Orthodox Patriarchs of Jerusalem
Clergy from Athens
Year of birth unknown